Takealot.com (stylised as takealot.com) is a South African e-commerce company based in Cape Town, South Africa. Is regarded as South Africa's largest online retailer, takealot.com has helped grow online shopping in South Africa, and was the first local retailer to take part in Black Friday. As of November 2019, over 2500 third-party businesses use the Takealot Marketplace platform to sell to over 1.8 million takealot.com shoppers.

History 
In October 2010, former MWEB CEO Kim Reid and US-based investment firm Tiger Global Management acquired existing South African ecommerce business Take2, renaming it takealot.com. Takealot.com was officially launched to the public in June 2011.

In 2014, takealot.com successfully launched its own on-demand food delivery service after acquiring Mr Delivery (rebranded Mr D Food) and Superbalist.com, a fashion e-tailer. In the same year, takealot.com announced that a merger would take place with Kalahari.com.  The merger was successfully completed in May 2015.

About

Delivery Network 
As of 2019, takealot.com contracts over 4,500 delivery drivers and carries out over 1.6 million monthly deliveries.

Distribution Centres 
Takealot.com currently has distribution centres in the Western Cape and Gauteng.

Collection Points 
In April 2019 takealot.com opened its first series of collection points, branded Takealot Pickup Points.  As of March 2020, over 50 Takealot Pickup Points are available in all 9 South African provinces.

Criticism 

Takealot has garnered attention from South African labour unions following protests from Takealot workers in July 2022. Some workers have stated that they work more than 12-hour shifts, with only one-hour lunch break.

See Also 

 Naspers

References



Online retailers of South Africa
Companies based in Cape Town
South African companies established in 2011